This is a list of defunct airlines of Haiti.

See also
 List of airlines of Haiti
 List of airports in Haiti

References

Haiti
Airlines
Airlines, defunct
Airlines